= Space M+A+X =

1986 video game

- Publisher: Final Frontier Software
- Release: 1986
- Genre: Simulation

Space M+A+X is a 1986 video game published by Final Frontier Software.

== Gameplay ==
Space M+A+X is a game in which the moon is colonized and mined.

== Reception ==
Johnny L. Wilson reviewed the game for Computer Gaming World, and stated that "MAX is a remarkable and fascinating simulation. It should be played by everyone who is even remotely interested in space exploration and/or hard science fiction. It should be savored by those of us who enjoy economic simulations."
